Stanislav Ivanov (born 7 October 1980 in Tiraspol) is a former Moldovan footballer.

Career
Ivanov began his career by FC Sheriff Tiraspol, before 2004 transferred to FC Moscow. On 21 January 2009 he moved to Lokomotiv Moscow, who have loaned out the Moldovan midfielder to Krylya Sovetov on 30 June 2009.

International
He played 9 games in 2006 FIFA World Cup qualification (UEFA) and 6 games in UEFA Euro 2008 qualifying.

References

External links

FIFA.com

1980 births
Living people
Moldovan footballers
Moldovan expatriate footballers
Moldova international footballers
Moldovan people of Russian descent
Transnistrian people of Russian descent
People from Tiraspol
Expatriate footballers in Russia
Association football midfielders
FC Sheriff Tiraspol players
FC Moscow players
FC Lokomotiv Moscow players
PFC Krylia Sovetov Samara players
Russian Premier League players
FC Rostov players